was the seventh shōgun of the Ashikaga shogunate who reigned from 1442 to 1443 during the Muromachi period of Japan.  Yoshikatsu was the son of 6th shōgun Ashikaga Yoshinori with his concubine, Hino Shigeko (1411–1463). His childhood name was Chiyachamaru (千也茶丸). Hino Tomiko, wife of Ashikaga Yoshimasa, at first was betrothed to Yoshikatsu.

In 1441, Shōgun Yoshinori is murdered at the age of 48 by Akamatsu Mitsusuke and shortly thereafter it is determined that his 8-year-old son, Yoshikatsu will become the new shōgun. Yoshikatsu is confirmed as shōgun the following year. On August 16, 1443 Yoshikatsu died at the age of 9. Fond of horse riding, he was fatally injured in a fall from a horse.  He had been shogun for only three years. His 8-year-old brother, Yoshinari, was then named shōgun. Several years after he became shogun, Yoshinari changed his name to Yoshimasa, and he is better known by that name.

Era of Yoshikatsu's bakufu
The years in which Yoshikatsu was shōgun are more specifically identified by only one era name or nengō.
 Kakitsu  (1441–1444)

See also
 East Asian age reckoning

Notes

References
 Ackroyd, Joyce. (1982) Lessons from History: The Tokushi Yoron. Brisbane: University of Queensland Press.  ;  OCLC 7574544
 Screech, Timon. (2006). Secret Memoirs of the Shoguns: Isaac Titsingh and Japan, 1779–1822. London: RoutledgeCurzon. ; OCLC 65177072
 Titsingh, Isaac. (1834). Nihon Ōdai Ichiran; ou,  Annales des empereurs du Japon.  Paris: Royal Asiatic Society, Oriental Translation Fund of Great Britain and Ireland. OCLC 585069

Yoshikatsu
1434 births
1443 deaths
15th-century shōguns
Yoshikatsu
1440s in Japan
15th-century Japanese people
15th-century monarchs in Asia
Deaths by horse-riding accident in Japan